Tema Metropolitan District is one of the twenty-nine districts in Greater Accra Region, Ghana. Originally created as a municipal district assembly in 1988 when it was known as Tema Municipal District, which was created from the former Tema District Council, until two parts of the district were later split off to create Adenta Municipal District (from the northwest part) and Ashaiman Municipal District (from the north central part) respectively on 29 February 2008; thus the remaining part was elevated to metropolitan district assembly status on that same year to become Tema Metropolitan District. However on 28 June 2012, the eastern part of the district was split off to create Kpone-Katamanso District (which was later elevated to municipal district assembly status to become Kpone-Katamanso Municipal District on 15 March 2018); thus the remaining part has been retained as Tema Metropolitan District. Later on 15 March 2018, a small western portion of the district was split off to create Tema West Municipal District; thus the remaining part has been retained as Tema Metropolitan District. The metropolis is located in the central part of Greater Accra Region and has Tema as its capital town.

Background
Tema Metropolis Assembly was made up of four districts  (Tema East, Tema South, Tema West and Tema North). This metropolis is grouped into twenty-six communities. The most popular and busiest communities are Communities 1, 2, 4, 7, 8, 9, 13 (Sakumono), 18, 19 and 20.

See also
 Tema Manhean

Sources
 
 GhanaDistricts.com

References

Districts of Greater Accra Region